Viola × williamsii, known as hybrid horned pansy, tufted pansy, or just horned pansy, is a hybrid between Viola cornuta and V. × wittrockiana (which itself is a hybrid of V. tricolor, V. lutea and V. altaica). It differs from V. cornuta in having wider, slightly overlapping petals, the lateral ones directed outwards or upwards, and more deeply dentate to laciniate stipules with the apical lobe clearly narrowed towards the base. It differs from V. × wittrockiana in at least one of the following characters: perennial habit, scented flowers and a longer spur.

Gallery

References

Bibliography 

 
 
 

williamsii
Plant nothospecies